Linn Township is an inactive township in Dent County, in the U.S. state of Missouri.

Linn Township was established in 1866, taking its name from the linden trees within its borders.

References

Townships in Missouri
Townships in Dent County, Missouri